The 2014 Greenwich Council election took place on 22 May 2014 to elect members of Greenwich Council in England. This was on the same day as other local elections.

At the 2014 elections, Labour won 43 seats (+3) and the Conservatives won 8 (-3). An Eltham North by-election on 10 November 2016 saw the Conservatives gain a seat from Labour with an 11% swing in their favour. This meant the opposition on the council increased to 9 seats.

Turnout across the borough was 37.25%.

2014-2018 by-elections

The by-election was called following the resignation of Cllr Matthew Pennycook, who was elected as the Member of Parliament for the Greenwich and Woolwich constituency the same night.

The by-election was called following the resignation of Councillor Radha Rabadia of the Labour Party.

The by-election was called following the resignation of Councillor Wynn Davies of the Labour Party.

References

Greenwich
2014
May 2014 events in the United Kingdom